Robert Gwyn East (born 7 July 1943) is a Welsh theatre and TV actor. He also wrote Incident at Tulse Hill, first produced at the Hampstead Theatre in December 1981 under the direction of Harold Pinter.

He is perhaps best known for playing Harry, the Prince of Wales, in BBC comedy series The Black Adder (1983).

East's other television appearances include regular appearances on Dave Allen at Large (1973–1979), as well as roles in Emma (1972), Napoleon and Love (1974), Moody and Pegg (1974), Rentaghost (1976), Happy Ever After (1976), Potter (1980), Kelly Monteith (1980), Yes, Minister (1982), Terry and June (1985), Rumpole of the Bailey (1987), Yes, Prime Minister (1987), Bread (1987), Alfred Crackenthorpe in the '4:50 from Paddington' episode of Miss Marple (1987),  'Allo 'Allo! (1991), Heartbeat (2003). and The Witness for the Prosecution (2016). He also made a brief appearance as a soldier in the film Figures in a Landscape (1970). 

East also taught English at Oakbank School in Sevenoaks, Kent, in 1988.

References

External links

Robert East on TV.com
Robert East on Film Database
Robert East in 'Blackadder'

1943 births
Living people
Welsh male television actors
People from Porthcawl